Zhangshania is an extinct genus of redlichiid trilobite. It lived during the later part of the Botomian stage, which lasted from approximately 524 to 518.5 million years ago. This faunal stage was part of the Cambrian Period.

References

Redlichioidea
Redlichiida genera
Cambrian trilobites of Asia